Hugh Kirkaldy (5 June 1868 – 4 April 1897) was a Scottish professional golfer who played in the late 19th century. He won the 1891 Open Championship.

Early life
Kirkaldy was born on 5 June 1868 at St Andrews, Scotland. His brothers, Andrew and Jack, were also professional golfers.

Golf career

1891 Open Championship
He won the 1891 Open Championship, which was played over the Old Course at St Andrews. The tournament was played in October, in rough weather, and his winning score was 166 for 36 holes. He beat his brother Andrew and Willie Fernie of Troon by two shots. It was the last Open Championship contested over 36 holes.

Death and legacy
On 4 April 1897, just six years after winning the 1891 Open Championship, he died of phthisis pulmonalis at the age of 28.

Results in major championships

Wins (1)

Results timeline

Note: Kirkaldy only played in The Open Championship.

"T" indicates a tie for a place

References

Scottish male golfers
Winners of men's major golf championships
Golfers from St Andrews
Tuberculosis deaths in Scotland
19th-century deaths from tuberculosis
1865 births
1895 deaths